Johan Lauritzen (9 June 1891 – 9 December 1967) was a Norwegian footballer. He played in one match for the Norway national football team in 1913.

References

External links
 

1891 births
1967 deaths
Norwegian footballers
Norway international footballers
Place of birth missing
Association footballers not categorized by position